The seventh season of Black-ish premiered on October 21, 2020 and concluded on May 18, 2021. It is produced by Khalabo Ink Society, Cinema Gypsy Productions, Artists First and ABC Signature, with creator Kenya Barris, who also serves as executive producer alongside Anthony Anderson, Brian Dobbins, Jonathan Groff and Helen Sugland.

The series revolves around Dre, portrayed by Anthony Anderson, a family man who struggles with finding his cultural identity while raising his kids in a white neighborhood with his wife, Bow (Tracee Ellis Ross).

Cast

Main cast
 Anthony Anderson as Andre "Dre" Johnson
 Tracee Ellis Ross as Rainbow "Bow" Johnson
 Marcus Scribner as Andre ("Junior") Johnson Jr.
 Miles Brown as Jack Johnson
 Marsai Martin as Diane Johnson
 Peter Mackenzie as Leslie Stevens
 Deon Cole as Charlie Telphy
 Jenifer Lewis as Ruby Johnson
 Jeff Meacham as Josh Oppenhol
 Katlyn Nichol as Olivia Lockhart

Recurring cast
 Laurence Fishburne as Earl "Pops" Johnson
 Yara Shahidi as Zoey Johnson
 Nelson Franklin as Connor Stevens
 Nicole Sullivan as Janine
 Catherine Reitman as Lucy
 Emerson Min as Mason
 Liz Jenkins as Ms. Biggs

Guest cast
 Judy Reyes as Dr. Paul
 Parminder Nagra as Dr. Smith
 Danny Glover as Uncle Norman
 Christina Anthony as Denise
 Ron Funches as Ladarius
 Affion Crockett as T Will
 Chris Spencer as Ronnie
 Henry Dittman as Wayne
 Rob Huebel as Gary
 Andrew Daly as Dr. Evan Windsor
 Nathan Morris as himself
 Shawn Stockman as himself
 Wanya Morris as himself

Episodes

Ratings

References

2020 American television seasons
2021 American television seasons
Black-ish